Xenophon Euthymiou Zolotas (26 April 1904 – 10 June 2004) was a Greek economist and served as an interim non-party Prime Minister of Greece.

Life and career
Born in Athens on 26 April 1904. He graduated from Rizarios Ecclesiastical School in Athens. Zolotas studied Law at the University of Athens, and later studied at the Leipzig University in Germany and the University of Paris in France. He came from a wealthy family of goldsmiths with roots in pre-revolutionary Russia. In 1928 he became Professor of Economics at Athens University and at Aristotle University of Thessaloniki, a post he held until 1968, when he resigned in protest at the military regime which had come to power in 1967. He was a member of the Board of Directors of UNRRA in 1946 and held senior posts in the International Monetary Fund and other international organisations in 1946 and 1981.

Zolotas was director of the Bank of Greece in 1944–1945, 1955–1967 (when he resigned in protest at the regime), and 1974–1981. He published many works on Greek and international economic topics. He was a Keynesian, and was active in socialist circles with his close friend, Professor Angelos Angelopoulos. He is also famous for demonstrating the contribution of Greek language to the English vocabulary by making English speeches, as he said, "using with the exception of articles and prepositions only Greek words", to foreign audiences.

When the elections of November 1989 failed to give a majority to either the PASOK party of Andreas Papandreou or the New Democracy party of Constantine Mitsotakis, Zolotas, then aged 85, agreed to become Prime Minister at head of a non-party administration until fresh elections could be held. He stepped down after the election of April 1990 which gave Mitsotakis a narrow majority.

He was a workaholic and an avid winter swimmer, making a point of swimming every morning throughout the year even into his nineties.

His book Economic Growth and Declining Social Welfare advances the idea that in modern economic growth there is an increasing output of useless and even discomforting things, such as advertising. For that reason modern economic growth cannot be at all considered as creating conditions for further human happiness, a thesis quite in agreement with ideas by authors such as Richard Easterlin or Herman Daly.

Zolotas died on 10 June 2004 at the age of 100. He is buried in the First Cemetery of Athens.

Speeches
Two of his speeches in English at the International Bank for Reconstruction and Development are considered to be historic and notable because they contained mainly terms of Greek origin. Here are the texts:

1957
I always wished to address this Assembly in Greek, but realized that it would have been indeed "Greek" to all present in this room. I found out, however, that I could make my address in Greek which would still be English to everybody. With your permission, Mr. Chairman, I shall do it now, using with the exception of articles and prepositions, only Greek words.

Kyrie, I eulogize the archons of the Panethnic Numismatic Thesaurus and the Ecumenical Trapeza for the orthodoxy of their axioms, methods and policies, although there is an episode of cacophony of the Trapeza with Hellas. With enthusiasm we dialogue and synagonize at the synods of our didymous organizations in which polymorphous economic ideas and dogmas are analyzed and synthesized. Our critical problems such as the numismatic plethora generate some agony and melancholy. This phenomenon is characteristic of our epoch. But, to my thesis, we have the dynamism to program therapeutic practices as a prophylaxis from chaos and catastrophe. In parallel, a Panethnic unhypocritical economic synergy and harmonization in a democratic climate is basic. I apologize for my eccentric monologue. I emphasize my euharistia to you, Kyrie to the eugenic and generous American Ethnos and to the organizers and protagonists of his Amphictyony and the gastronomic symposia.

1959
Kyrie, it is Zeus' anathema on our epoch for the dynamism of our economies and the heresy of our economic methods and policies that we should agonize the Scylla of numismatic plethora and the Charybdis of economic anaemia. It is not my idiosyncrasy to be ironic or sarcastic, but my diagnosis would be that politicians are rather cryptoplethorists. Although they emphatically stigmatize numismatic plethora, they energize it through their tactics and practices. Our policies have to be based more on economic and less on political criteria. Our gnomon has to be a metron between political, strategic and philanthropic scopes. Political magic has always been anti-economic. In an epoch characterized by monopolies, oligopolies, monopsonies, monopolistic antagonism and polymorphous inelasticities, our policies have to be more orthological. But this should not be metamorphosed into plethorophobia, which is endemic among academic economists. Numismatic symmetry should not hyper-antagonize economic acme. A greater harmonization between the practices of the economic and numismatic archons is basic. Parallel to this, we have to synchronize and harmonize more and more our economic and numismatic policies panethnically. These scopes are more practicable now, when the prognostics of the political and economic barometer are halcyonic. The history of our didymus organizations in this sphere has been didactic and their gnostic practices will always be a tonic to the polyonymous and idiomorphous ethnical economies. The genesis of the programmed organization will dynamize these policies. Therefore, I sympathize, although not without criticism on one or two themes, with the apostles and the hierarchy of our organs in their zeal to program orthodox economic and numismatic policies, although I have some logomachy with them. I apologize for having tyrannized you with my Hellenic phraseology. In my epilogue, I emphasize my eulogy to the philoxenous autochthons of this cosmopolitan metropolis and my encomium to you, Kyrie, and the stenographers.

See also
 List of prime ministers of Greece
 English words of Greek origin

References

External links
 Zolotas' speeches

|-

|-

|-

1904 births
2004 deaths
1980s in Greek politics
1990s in Greek politics
20th-century prime ministers of Greece
Burials at the First Cemetery of Athens
Governors of the Bank of Greece
Greek bankers
Greek centenarians
Men centenarians
20th-century Greek economists
Politicians from Athens
Members of the Academy of Athens (modern)
National and Kapodistrian University of Athens alumni
Writers from Athens
Prime Ministers of Greece
Knights Commander of the Order of Merit of the Federal Republic of Germany